Elections to Cumnock and Doon Valley District Council were held on 3 May 1984, on the same day as the other Scottish local government elections. This was the fourth election to the district council following the local government reforms in the 1970s.

The election was the first to use the 10 wards created by the Initial Statutory Reviews of Electoral Arrangements in 1981. Each ward elected one councillor using first-past-the-post voting.

Labour maintained control of the district council after winning all 10 seats although four wards were uncontested after only Labour stood a candidate. Despite the uncontested seats, Labour increased their vote share by more than 20% and took nearly three-quarters of the popular vote.

Results

Source:

Ward results

Cumnock East

Lugar, Logan and Muirkirk

Cumnock South and Old Cumnock

Cumnock West and Auchinleck

Catrine, Sorn and North Auchinleck

New Cumnock

Dalmellington

Patna and Dalrymple

Drongan, Ochiltree, Rankinston and Stair

Mauchline

References

Cumnock
Cumnock and Doon Valley District Council elections